The 2017 WNBA season of the Minnesota Lynx is their 19th season in the Women's National Basketball Association (WNBA). The Lynx finished the 2016 season with a record of 28–6, finishing first in the Western Conference (and the league as a whole) and qualifying for the playoffs, before ultimately beating Los Angeles in the WNBA Finals to win their league-tying best fourth championship.

The Lynx moved from their normal home, Target Center in Minneapolis, to the Xcel Energy Center in St. Paul for the 2017 season due to the renovation that would be taking place at Target Center. Due to the Minnesota Wild season beginning, the Lynx announced that the entirety of their playoff run would be played at the University of Minnesota's Williams Arena.

The Lynx opened the season on May 14 with a 70–61 victory over the Chicago Sky. Sylvia Fowles led the way with 26 points and 10 rebounds. During the May 20 game versus the Dallas Wings, Rebekkah Brunson recorded her 3,000th career rebound, becoming the fifth player in league history to do so. Cheryl Reeve was named the inaugural WNBA Coach of the Month for the month of May. Lindsay Whalen became the all-time winningest player in WNBA history with 295 wins, with a June 9 victory over the Washington Mystics. The win broke the tie with Swin Cash, giving Whalen first place in that category all by herself.

With the win against the San Antonio Stars on June 25, Seimone Augustus, Rebekkah Brunson, Maya Moore, and Lindsay Whalen became the winningest quartet in WNBA History with 122 wins, passing the Los Angeles Sparks quartet of Tamecka Dixon, Lisa Leslie, Mwadi Mabika, and Delisha Milton-Jones who recorded 121 from 1999 to 2004. During the July 6 victory over the Sparks, Maya Moore scored her 4,000th career point.

Four Lynx players were named to the West All-Star Team - Maya Moore, Sylvia Fowles, Seimone Augustus, Rebekkah Brunson. Moore and Fowles were named starters, while Augustus and Brunson were named reserves. Brunson was selected as a replacement player for the injured Brittney Griner. During the July 16 game versus the Phoenix Mercury, Sylvia Fowles scored her 4,000th career point. Sylvia Fowles recorded her 500th career block during the July 25 game versus the New York Liberty, becoming the seventh person in league history to do so. Fowles grabbed her 2,500th career rebound during the August 8 game versus the Atlanta Dream. She became the 10th player in league history to reach that milestone.

The Lynx unveiled their new logo, which will be used in the 2018 season, at the halftime of the August 11 game versus the Los Angeles Sparks.

The team made WNBA history with the 111–52 victory over the Indiana Fever, breaking the WNBA record for margin of victory (59), largest run (37-0), and largest halftime lead (45). They also broke Lynx franchise records for most points in a half (68) and most field goals in any half (27), while tying a record for most points in any quarter (37). During the same game, Jia Perkins passed Katie Douglas on the WNBA all-time steals list to move into fifth place. After beating the San Antonio Stars on August 25 to begin a 3-game road trip, the Lynx clinched a spot in the WNBA semifinals.

With their August 30 victory over the Indiana Fever, the Lynx recorded their 25th win of the season, which they have now done for six seasons in team history, tying a WNBA record. During the September 1 game versus the Chicago Sky, Maya Moore passed Katie Smith for the franchise record for career 3-pointers. On September 2, the WNBA and the Lynx announced that Minnesota would be the host of the 2018 WNBA All-Star Game. This would be the first time that the Lynx have hosted the All-Star Game. Following their regular season finale victory over the Washington Mystics, the Lynx clinched the overall top seed in the 2017 WNBA Playoffs.

By earning the top seed in the playoffs, the Lynx advanced to the semifinal round and faced the Washington Mystics. The Lynx swept the Mystics 3–0 to advance to the WNBA Finals. It is the Lynx's sixth time in seven years advancing to the Finals. The Lynx defeated the Los Angeles Sparks in 5 games to win their fourth WNBA championship in seven years, tying the now-defunct Houston Comets for most championship titles.

Transactions

WNBA Draft

Trades and roster changes

Roster

Depth chart

Schedule

Preseason

|- style="background:#cfc;"
		 | 1
		 | May 5
		 | Atlanta
		 | 
		 | Natasha Howard (19)
		 | Chantel Osahor (6)
		 | Chantel Osahor  Alexis Jones (5)
		 | Xcel Energy Center5,132
		 | 1–0
|- style="background:#cfc;"
		 | 2
		 | May 8
		 | @ Washington
		 | 
		 | Rebekkah Brunson (14)
		 | Rebekkah Brunson (7)
		 | Lindsay Whalen (5)
		 | Verizon Center1,426
		 | 2–0

Regular season

|- style="background:#cfc;"
		 | 1
		 | May 14
		 | Chicago
		 | 
		 | Sylvia Fowles (26)
		 | Sylvia Fowles (10)
		 | Maya Moore (6)
		 | Xcel Energy Center9,234
		 | 1–0
|- style="background:#cfc;"
		 | 2
		 | May 18
		 | @ New York
		 | 
		 | Maya Moore (16)
		 | Maya Moore (11)
		 | Maya Moore (6)
		 | Madison Square Garden7,004
		 | 2–0
|- style="background:#cfc;"
		 | 3
		 | May 20
		 | @ Dallas
		 | 
		 | Sylvia Fowles (27)
		 | Sylvia Fowles (13)
		 | Lindsay Whalen (6)
		 | College Park Center5,169
		 | 3–0
|- style="background:#cfc;"
		 | 4
		 | May 23
		 | Connecticut
		 | 
		 | Sylvia Fowles (21)
		 | Sylvia Fowles (13)
		 | Maya Moore (5)
		 | Xcel Energy Center8,033
		 | 4–0
|- style="background:#cfc;"
		 | 5
		 | May 26
		 | @ Connecticut
		 | 
		 | Sylvia Fowles (20)
		 | Maya Moore (11)
		 | Seimone AugustusRenee Montgomery (4)
		 | Mohegan Sun Arena6,333
		 | 5–0
|- style="background:#cfc;"
		 | 6
		 | May 28
		 | San Antonio
		 | 
		 | Sylvia Fowles (14)
		 | Sylvia Fowles (12)
		 | Lindsay Whalen (10)
		 | Xcel Energy Center9,034
		 | 6–0

|- style="background:#cfc;"
		 | 7
		 | June 3
		 | @ Seattle
		 | 
		 | Sylvia Fowles (26)
		 | Sylvia FowlesSeimone Augustus (7)
		 | Maya Moore (4)
		 | KeyArena7,576
		 | 7–0
|- style="background:#cfc;"
		 | 8
		 | June 9
		 | @ Washington
		 | 
		 | Sylvia Fowles (21)
		 | Sylvia Fowles (11)
		 | Maya MooreLindsay Whalen (6)
		 | Verizon Center6,518
		 | 8–0
|- style="background:#cfc;"
		 | 9
		 | June 11
		 | @ Dallas
		 | 
		 | Sylvia Fowles (30)
		 | Rebekkah Brunson (14)
		 | Seimone Augustus (9)
		 | College Park Center3,998
		 | 9–0
|- style="background:#fcc;"
		 | 10
		 | June 17
		 | Connecticut
		 | 
		 | Maya Moore (22)
		 | Sylvia Fowles (7)
		 | Rebekkah Brunson (5)
		 | Xcel Energy Center10,121
		 | 9–1
|- style="background:#cfc;"
		 | 11
		 | June 23
		 | Washington
		 | 
		 | Maya Moore (22)
		 | Sylvia Fowles (15)
		 | Maya Moore (7)
		 | Xcel Energy Center9,723
		 | 10–1
|- style="background:#cfc;"
		 | 12
                 | June 25
		 | San Antonio
		 | 
		 | Sylvia FowlesMaya Moore (22)
		 | Rebekkah BrunsonSylvia Fowles (10)
		 | Seimone Augustus (5)
		 | Xcel Energy Center9,013
		 | 11–1
|- style="background:#cfc;"
		 | 13
		 | June 30
		 | @ Phoenix
		 | 
		 | Maya Moore (21)
		 | Rebekkah Brunson (10)
		 | Maya Moore (5)
		 | Talking Stick Resort Arena11,330
		 | 12–1

|- style="background:#cfc;"
		 | 14
		 | July 6
		 | Los Angeles
		 | 
		 | Sylvia FowlesRenee Montgomery (20)
		 | Sylvia Fowles (13)
		 | Renee Montgomery (4)
		 | Xcel Energy Center9,821
		 | 13–1
|- style="background:#fcc;"
		 | 15
		 | July 8
		 | @ Chicago
		 | 
		 | Rebekkah Brunson (22)
		 | Sylvia Fowles (6)
		 | Lindsay Whalen (5)
		 | Allstate Arena6,942
		 | 13–2
|- style="background:#cfc;"
		 | 16
		 | July 14
		 | @ Phoenix
		 | 
		 | Seimone AugustusMaya Moore (19)
		 | Sylvia Fowles (10)
		 | Maya Moore (7)
		 | Talking Stick Resort Arena10,493
		 | 14–2
|- style="background:#cfc;"
		 | 17
		 | July 16
		 | Phoenix
		 | 
		 | Sylvia Fowles (18)
		 | Maya Moore (9)
		 | Seimone Augustus (3)
		 | Xcel Energy Center10,022
		 | 15–2
|- style="background:#cfc;"
		 | 18
		 | July 19
		 | Dallas
		 | 
		 | Sylvia Fowles (24)
		 | Sylvia Fowles (12)
		 | Seimone Augustus (9)
		 | Xcel Energy Center17,834
		 | 16–2
|- style="background:#cfc;"
		 | 19
                 | July 25
		 | New York
		 | 
		 | Maya Moore (27)
		 | Sylvia Fowles (9)
		 | Seimone AugustusRebekkah BrunsonPlenette Pierson (3)
		 | Xcel Energy Center10,123
		 | 17–2
|- style="background:#cfc;"
		 | 20
		 | July 28
		 | @ Atlanta
		 | 
		 | Sylvia Fowles (29)
		 | Rebekkah BrunsonSylvia Fowles (8)
		 | Seimone Augustus (10)
		 | McCamish Pavilion4,197
		 | 18–2
|- style="background:#cfc;"
		 | 21
		 | July 30
		 | Seattle
		 | 
		 | Sylvia Fowles (29)
		 | Sylvia Fowles (12)
		 | Jia Perkins (7)
		 | Xcel Energy Center12,432
		 | 19–2

|- style="background:#cfc;"
		 | 22
		 | August 3
		 | Atlanta
		 | 
		 | Sylvia Fowles (25)
		 | Sylvia Fowles (13)
		 | Renee Montgomery (7)
		 | Xcel Energy Center9,622
		 | 20–2
|- style="background:#fcc;"
		 | 23
		 | August 6
		 | @ Indiana
		 | 
		 | Maya Moore (28)
		 | Rebekkah Brunson (12)
		 | Seimone Augustus (4)
		 | Bankers Life Fieldhouse8,226
		 | 20–3
|- style="background:#cfc;"
		 | 24
		 | August 8
		 | @ Atlanta
		 | 
		 | Sylvia Fowles (27)
		 | Sylvia Fowles (13)
		 | Renee Montgomery (6)
		 | McCamish Pavilion4,006
		 | 21–3
|- style="background:#fcc;"
		 | 25
		 | August 11
		 | Los Angeles
		 | 
		 | Sylvia Fowles (17)
		 | Sylvia Fowles (13)
		 | Seimone Augustus (6)
		 | Xcel Energy Center11,533
		 | 21–4
|- style="background:#fcc;"
		 | 26
		 | August 16
		 | @ Seattle
		 | 
		 | Maya Moore (15)
		 | Sylvia Fowles (13)
		 | Renee Montgomery (4)
		 | KeyArena7,876
		 | 21–5
|- style="background:#cfc;"
		 | 27
                 | August 18
		 | Indiana
		 | 
		 | Sylvia Fowles (25)
		 | Natasha HowardJia Perkins (7)
		 | Seimone Augustus (8)
		 | Xcel Energy Center9,621
		 | 22–5
|- style="background:#fcc;"
		 | 28
		 | August 20
		 | @ New York
		 | 
		 | Maya Moore (22)
		 | Sylvia Fowles (15)
		 | Renee MontgomerySeimone AugustusPlenette Pierson (3)
		 | Madison Square Garden10,007
		 | 22–6
|- style="background:#cfc;"
		 | 29
		 | August 22
		 | Phoenix
		 | 
		 | Maya Moore (21)
		 | Sylvia Fowles (10)
		 | Renee Montgomery (7)
		 | Xcel Energy Center10,723
		 | 23–6
|- style="background:#cfc;"
		 | 30
		 | August 25
		 | @ San Antonio
		 | 
		 | Maya Moore (24)
		 | Sylvia Fowles (10)
		 | Renee Montgomery (8)
		 | AT&T Center7,950
		 | 24–6
|- style="background:#fcc;"
		 | 31
		 | August 27
		 | @ Los Angeles
		 | 
		 | Sylvia Fowles (17)
		 | Sylvia Fowles (14)
		 | Seimone Augustus (6)
		 | Staples Center19,282
		 | 24–7
|- style="background:#cfc;"
		 | 32
		 | August 30
		 | @ Indiana
		 | 
		 | Maya Moore (18)
		 | Sylvia Fowles (13)
		 | Maya MooreSeimone AugustusNatasha Howard (3)
		 | Bankers Life Fieldhouse7,625
		 | 25–7

|- style="background:#cfc;"
		 | 33
		 | September 1
		 | Chicago
		 | 
		 | Sylvia Fowles (27)
		 | Sylvia Fowles (12)
		 | Maya Moore (9)
		 | Xcel Energy Center9,709
		 | 26–7
|- style="background:#cfc;"
		 | 34
		 | September 3
		 | Washington
		 | 
		 | Maya Moore (26)
		 | Sylvia Fowles (8)
		 | Sylvia Fowles (5)
		 | Xcel Energy Center10,321
		 | 27–7

Playoffs

|- style="background:#cfc;"
		 | 1
		 | September 12
		 | Washington
		 | 
		 | Seimone Augustus (24)
		 | Sylvia Fowles (7)
		 | Maya Moore (4)
		 | Williams Arena7,834
		 | 1–0
|- style="background:#cfc;"
		 | 2
		 | September 14
		 | Washington
		 | 
		 | Sylvia Fowles (25)
		 | Rebekkah Brunson (10)
		 | Lindsay Whalen (7)
		 | Williams Arena9,033
		 | 2–0
|- style="background:#cfc;"
		 | 3
		 | September 17
		 | Washington
		 | 
		 | Maya Moore (21)
		 | Sylvia Fowles (14)
		 | Lindsay WhalenMaya Moore (5)
		 | Capital One Arena7,950
		 | 3–0

|- style="background:#fcc;"
		 | 1
		 | September 24
		 | Los Angeles
		 | 
                 | Maya Moore (27)
		 | Sylvia Fowles (13)
		 | Lindsay Whalen (6)
		 | Williams Arena 11,823
		 | 0–1
|- style="background:#cfc;"
		 | 2
		 | September 26
		 | Los Angeles
		 | 
		 | Lindsay Whalen (14)
		 | Sylvia Fowles (17)
		 | Rebekkah BrunsonLindsay Whalen (3)
		 | Williams Arena 11,434
		 | 1–1
|- style="background:#fcc;"
		 | 3
		 | September 29
		 | Los Angeles
		 | 
		 | Maya Moore (16)
		 | Sylvia Fowles (11)
		 | Alexis Jones (4)
		 | Staples Center 13,500
		 | 1–2
|- style="background:#cfc;"
		 | 4
		 | October 1
		 | Los Angeles
		 | 
		 | Sylvia Fowles (22)
		 | Sylvia Fowles (14)
		 | Lindsay Whalen (8)
		 | Staples Center 13,500
		 | 2–2
|- style="background:#cfc;"
		 | 5
		 | October 4
		 | Los Angeles
		 | 
		 | Maya Moore (18)
		 | Sylvia Fowles (20)
		 | Lindsay Whalen (8)
		 | Williams Arena 14,632
		 | 3–2

Statistics

Regular season

Playoffs

Standings

Playoffs

Awards and milestones

References

External links
The Official Site of the Minnesota Lynx

Minnesota Lynx seasons
Minnesota
2017 in sports in Minnesota
Women's National Basketball Association championship seasons